Professor T. is a British crime drama television series starring Ben Miller as Professor Jasper Tempest, a genius University of Cambridge criminologist with obsessive–compulsive personality disorder, Emma Naomi, Barney White, and Frances de la Tour. It is an adaptation from the Belgian TV series of the same name. It began broadcasting on Britbox on 3 June 2021, ITV on 18 July 2021, and PBS in the United States on 11 July 2021.

On 6 October 2021, it was announced it had been renewed for a second series, which premiered on 16 September 2022. In 2023, it was renewed for a third series.

Premise
Professor Jasper Tempest, a genius criminologist at Cambridge University, who has OCD and an overbearing mother, assists the police in solving crimes.

Cast
 Ben Miller as Professor Jasper Tempest
 Emma Naomi as DS Lisa Donckers
 Barney White as DS Dan Winters
 Andy Gathergood as DI Paul Rabbit
 Sarah Woodward as Ingrid Snares
 Juliet Aubrey	as DCI Christina Brand
 Frances de la Tour as Adelaide Tempest

Recurring 
 Douglas Reith as The Dean
 Juliet Stevenson as Dr. Helena Goldberg (series 2)

Episodes

Series Overview

Series 1 (2021)

Series 2 (2022)

Reception 
Carol Midgley of The Times gave it two stars out of five, praising Miller but lambasting the plot and tonal shifts. Ed Cumming of The Independent also commended Miller's performance as well as Naomi's and de la Tour's, but suggested that the show "isn't quite there yet".

Anita Singh of The Daily Telegraph criticised the use of rape in the show's first episode, as well as the scenes depicting the attacks, stating: "There is promise in Tempest’s story, but, please, can this be the last time that rape is used as cheap entertainment?".

Controversy
Professor T. received strong criticism from national OCD organisations, arguing the show promoted stereotypes (akin to Channel 4's Obsessive Compulsive Cleaners). The British charity OCD-UK stated: 
 "The start of the series is no better than the opening sequence… a pair of hands being scrubbed hospital theatre style, rather than OCD style, and just like that ITV’s failure to accurately portray OCD begins." "As that first scene ends, not a word spoken and this crime series already feels like a crime against the accurate portrayal of mental health problems." "The reality is that OCD doesn’t really appear integral to the show and is not adding anything but creating a quirkiness about the character, and that could so easily have been done without giving the character Compulsive Disorder…. I won’t say Obsessive-Compulsive Disorder, because there doesn't appear to be any reference to the obsessions that cause the behaviours across any of the six episodes. Whilst I know that Professor T is not a documentary, ITV have a responsibility not to create programming that is stigmatic and perpetuates stereotypes."

References

External links
 
 

2021 British television series debuts
2020s British crime drama television series
2020s British mystery television series
British detective television series
ITV crime dramas
English-language television shows
Obsessive–compulsive disorder in fiction
Television shows set in the United Kingdom
Television shows set in Cambridgeshire